Kuman language can refer to three different languages:
 Kuman language (Uganda), a Western Nilotic language spoken in Uganda
 Kuman language (New Guinea),  Chimbu, spoken in Papua New Guinea
 Kuman language (Russia), an extinct Turkic language also known as Fergana Kipchak or Kipchak Uzbek
 Cuman language, an extinct Turkic language once spoken by the Cumans in the steppes of Eastern Europe